Pandoraea sputorum is a Gram-negative, nonfermenting bacterium of the genus Pandoraea, isolated from the sputum of a patient who suffered on cystic fibrosis. P. sputorum can deteriorate the lung function if it is not treated.

References

External links
Type strain of Pandoraea sputorum at BacDive -  the Bacterial Diversity Metadatabase

Burkholderiaceae